Adam Charles Gross (born 16 February 1986) is an English footballer. He played a handful of games for Wales at youth level. He has also represented England on a number of occasions, turning out for the National Game XI. He plays as a left-back for Thurrock.

References

External links

1986 births
Living people
English footballers
England semi-pro international footballers
Welsh footballers
Association football defenders
Charlton Athletic F.C. players
Barnet F.C. players
Grays Athletic F.C. players
Weymouth F.C. players
Thurrock F.C. players
Dartford F.C. players
Erith & Belvedere F.C. players
Leatherhead F.C. players
Cray Valley Paper Mills F.C. players
English Football League players
National League (English football) players